The 2018 Georgia State Senate elections took place as part of the biennial United States elections. Georgia voters elected state senators in all 56 of the state senate's districts. State senators serve two-year terms in the Georgia State Senate.

A primary election on May 22, 2018 determined which candidates appear on the November 6 general election ballot. Primary election results can be obtained from the Georgia Secretary of State's website. A statewide map of Georgia's state Senate districts can be obtained from the Georgia Legislative and Congressional Reapportionment Office here, and individual district maps can be obtained from the U.S. Census here.

Following the 2016 state senate elections, Republicans maintained effective control of the Senate with 38 members. However, on December 5, 2017 Democrats flipped State Senate district 6 after Democrat Jen Jordan won a special election. This decreased Republican seats from 38 to 37 and increased Democratic seats from 18 to 19.

To reclaim control of the chamber from Republicans, the Democrats would need to net 9 Senate seats and win the concurrent lieutenant gubernatorial election or net 10 seats without the Lieutenant Governor's office. Democrats flipped two seats—districts 40 and 48—from Republican control; however, Republicans retained control of the Georgia State Senate following the 2018 general election.

Results

Summary of Results

Source:

Closest races 
Seats where the margin of victory was under 10%:
  
  
  (gain)
  
   (gain)

Detailed Results

Note: If a district only lists one primary election, the other major party failed to field a candidate in that district.
Sources:

District 1

District 2

District 3

District 4

District 5

District 6

District 7

District 8

District 9

District 10

District 11

District 12

District 13

District 14

District 15

District 16

District 17

District 18

District 19

District 20

District 21

District 22

District 23

District 24

District 25

District 26

District 27

District 28

District 29

District 30

District 31

District 32

District 33

District 34

District 35

District 36

District 37

District 38

District 39

District 40

District 41

District 42

District 43

District 44

District 45

District 46

District 47

District 48

District 49

District 50

District 51

District 52

District 53

District 54

District 55

District 56

See also
 United States elections, 2018
 United States House of Representatives elections in Georgia, 2018
 Georgia elections, 2018
 Georgia gubernatorial election, 2018
 Georgia lieutenant gubernatorial election, 2018
 Georgia Secretary of State election, 2018
 Georgia House of Representatives election, 2018
 Elections in Georgia (U.S. state)

References

2018 Georgia (U.S. state) elections
Georgia State Senate elections
Georgia State Senate